Paul Jams Kuczo (February 4, 1903 – December 4, 1970) was an American football player. 

Kuczo was born in Stamford, Connecticut, in 1903. He attended Stamford High School where he played football, baseball (as a pitcher), and basketball (as a guard and forward).

He played college football as the quarterback for Villanova. He was captain of the 1927 Villanova Wildcats football team that compiled a 6–1 record. 

He played professional football in the National Football League (NFL) for the Staten Island Stapletons. He appeared in four NFL games, one as a starter, during the 1929 season.

He also played baseball. He was a pitcher for Villanova's baseball team. After graduating from Villanova, he played for Stamford and Bridgeport, Connecticut, in the Eastern League.

After retiring as a player, Kuczo was the football coach at Stamford High School from 1928 to 1968. His teams won Connecticut state championships in 1937, 1950, 1952, and 1953.

References

1903 births
1970 deaths
Villanova Wildcats football players
Staten Island Stapletons players
Players of American football from Connecticut
Sportspeople from Stamford, Connecticut